Golden Days is the sixth studio album by American singer-songwriter Dave Barnes. It his second album to be released on 50 Year Plan Records.

Track listing
 "Twenty Three" – 3:55
 "Loving Los Angeles" – 3:42
 "Good" – 4:03
 "All She Wants Is You" – 3:22
 "Little Civil War" (feat. Lucie Silvas) – 3:32
 "Something More" – 3:17
 "Heartbroken Down" – 3:23
 "By Two" – 3:54
 "Can't She Try" – 3:12
 "Sharon Sue" – 3:07
 "Hotel Keys" – 3:36

References

External links
Dave Barnes official website

Dave Barnes albums
2014 albums